Wellford may refer to:

Places
United States
 Wellford, South Carolina
 Wellford, Virginia
 Wellford, West Virginia

People
 Alexander Wellford (1911–1994), American tennis player
 Beverly R. Wellford (1797–1870), American physician
 Charles Wellford, American criminologist
 Charles Wellford Leavitt (1871–1928), American architect
 Harry W. Wellford (1924–2021), American judge and lawyer
 R. Carter Wellford (1853–1919), American politician

See also 
 Welford (disambiguation)